Mikhail Sergeyevich Glukhov (born May 13, 1988) is a Russian professional ice hockey winger who currently plays for Ak Bars Kazan of the Kontinental Hockey League (KHL).

Glukhov has previously played with HC Atlant Moscow, HC Lada Togliatti and Amur Khabarovsk.

In his third tenure with Atlant Moscow, Glukhov was traded during the 2014–15 season, to Ak Bars Kazan in exchange for Evgeny Bodrov on November 20, 2014.

Awards and honours

References

External links

1988 births
Living people
Ak Bars Kazan players
Amur Khabarovsk players
Atlant Moscow Oblast players
HC Lada Togliatti players
Russian ice hockey left wingers
People from Orsk
Sportspeople from Orenburg Oblast